The 2006 election for Mayor of Newark took place in Newark, the most populous city in the state of New Jersey, on May 9, 2006. Newark is organized under the Faulkner Act. Elections for all seats on the nine member Municipal Council of Newark were held the same day. A runoff election, if necessary, would have taken place. Elections in the city are non-partisan and candidates are not listed by political party. 

Incumbent Sharpe James did not run. Ronald L. Rice, State Senator since 1986  for 28th Legislative District, and Municipal Council member Cory Booker were the main candidates in the field of four. Booker won with 72% of the vote, thus precluding run-off. Rice, the runner-up, received 23%.

Candidates
On March 27, 2006, James announced that he would not seek a sixth term, preferring to focus on his seat in the New Jersey Senate.

On March 6, 2006, Rice entered the mayoral race again, noting "that Mayor James had encouraged him to run but noted that if the mayor decided to join the race, his candidacy could change."  

Booker had become municipal council member in 1998. He run and lost in the 2002 mayoral election, his campaign for which is the subject of the 2005 documentary Street Fight. Booker was re-elected in the 2010 election. After winning the October 16 special election for U.S. senator Booker resigned as mayor and was sworn in on October 31, 2013 as the junior U.S. senator from New Jersey. In 2019, he mounted a campaign to participate in 2020 Democratic Party presidential primaries.

References

External links

Cory Booker
2006
2006 United States mayoral elections
Newark